Psathyrella spadicea or Homophron spadiceum, commonly known as the chestnut brittlestem, is a species of agaric fungus in the family Psathyrellaceae. The fungus was originally described by German mycologist Jacob Christian Schäffer in 1783 as Agaricus spadiceus. Rolf Singer transferred it to the genus Psathyrella in 1951, in which it was classified in the section Spadiceae.  In 2015 Örstadius & Larsson recreated the genus Homophron (a name used at the sub-genus level since 1883) for a group of psathyrelloid mushrooms with no veil and with light-coloured spores, and P. spadicea was moved to the new genus.

Psathyrella spadicea is found in Europe and North America. In North America, it is more common in northern regions, including Alaska and the Yukon Territories, than further south. Fruitbodies produce reddish to red-brown spore prints.

This mushroom is edible.

See also
List of Psathyrella species

References

External links

Edible fungi
Fungi described in 1783
Fungi of Europe
Fungi of North America
Psathyrellaceae
Taxa named by Jacob Christian Schäffer